Ala'a Hussein Ali Al-Khafaji Al-Jaber ( ; born ) served as the head of a brief puppet government in Kuwait (the "Republic of Kuwait", August 4–8, 1990) during the initial stages of the Gulf War.

Career
Ali held dual nationalities as an Iraqi and Kuwaiti, having grown up in Kuwait and studied in Baghdad where he became a member of the ruling Baath party.  Having held a lieutenant's commission in the Kuwaiti army prior to the invasion, Ali was promoted to colonel in Baghdad and placed at the head of a 9-member puppet government during the invasion. A week later Kuwait was annexed by Iraq and Ali became Iraqi Deputy Prime Minister.

In 1993, Ali was sentenced in absentia to death by hanging for treason by the Kuwaiti government.  In January 2000 he returned to Kuwait attempting to appeal the sentence. The court however, confirmed Ali guilty of treason again on May 3, 2000. In March 2001, his sentence was commuted to life in prison.

References

External links
The Story of the Kuwaiti Quisling
BBC: Death penalty for puppet leader

1940s births
Kuwaiti politicians
Rulers of Kuwait
Living people
Kuwaiti prisoners sentenced to death
Prisoners sentenced to death by Kuwait
People sentenced to death in absentia
People convicted of treason
Kuwaiti people of Iraqi descent
Republicanism in Kuwait
Arab Socialist Ba'ath Party – Iraq Region politicians